Henveiru is a district of Malé, Maldives. It is located to the east of Malé Island, and has an estimated area of 59 hectares and 27,254 inhabitants according to projections for 2014. It is also the largest district on Malé Island.

Location within Malé City 
Henveiru is on the eastern portion of Malé Island:

Notable Places 

 Artificial Beach
 Henveiru Sahara (Cemetery)
 Henveiru Stadium
 Hukuru Miskiy (Friday Mosque)
 Islamic Centre
 King Salman Mosque
 Lonuziyaaraiy Park
 Maldives Police Service
 Muliaage
 People’s Majlis
 President’s Office
 Republic Square
 Sinamalé Bridge

 Victory Monument

References 

Populated places in the Maldives